Viktor Troicki  was the defending champion, but chose not to defend his title.

Seeds

Draw

Finals

Top half

Bottom half

References
 Main Draw
 Qualifying Draw

Banja Luka Challenger - Singles
2015 Singles
2015 in Bosnia and Herzegovina